Cambodian Commercial Bank (en 
français: Banque commerciale du Cambodge) is the first foreign owned bank in Cambodia.  It was established in 1991.

It is fully owned by the Siam Commercial Bank of Thailand, there are currently 4 branches in Cambodia serving a variety of business customers.。The bank's commercial license was renewed indefinitely on November 28th, 2006.

References

External links
Official Web-site for the bank

Banks of Cambodia
Banks established in 1991
Cambodian companies established in 1991